State Road 548 (SR 548), also known as the Lakeland In-Town Bypass, is a short six-lane arterial in Lakeland, Florida, United States, opened in early 2004. It connects George Jenkins Boulevard (west of downtown) to U.S. Highway 98 (US 98) and SR 600 (Bartow Road and Main Street) east of downtown, allowing traffic to bypass downtown.

History

SR 548 opened in 2004.

Second phase
SR 548 was extended west across SR 563 (Martin Luther King Jr. Avenue) and SR 539 (Kathleen Road) terminating at George Jenkins Boulevard west of downtown. This provides a full east–west bypass to supplement US 92 (Memorial Boulevard) and SR 400 (Interstate 4).

Major intersections

References

External links

In-Town Bypass may open soon (Lakeland Ledger; October 23, 2009)
FDOT Map of Polk County (Including SR 548)

548
548